The 2015 Canberra Raiders season was the 34th in the club's history. Coached by Ricky Stuart and captained by Jarrod Croker, they competed in the National Rugby League's 2015 Telstra Premiership.

Ladder

Squad List

Gains

Losses

Fixtures

Preseason

NRL Auckland Nines

The NRL Auckland Nines is a pre-season rugby league nines competition featuring all 16 NRL clubs. The 2015 competition was played over two days on 31 January and 1 February at Eden Park. The Raiders feature in the Hunua Ranges pool and played the Tigers, Warriors and Titans.

Source:

Regular season

Statistics
Source:

References

Canberra Raiders seasons
Canberra Raiders season